The Scottish Executive Environment and Rural Affairs Department (SEERAD) was a civil service department of the Scottish Executive. SEERAD was responsible for the following areas in Scotland: agriculture, rural development, food, the environment and fisheries. Following the change of administration in May 2007, a restructuring exercise led to most SEERAD functions being continued under the new Scottish Executive Environment Directorate. 

SEERAD was directly responsible for various agencies of the Scottish Executive and other public bodies relating to these areas of responsibility. From early 2005 the Department was headed by Richard Wakeford. The Minister for Environment and Rural Development was Ross Finnie and he was assisted by the Deputy Minister for Environment and Rural Development, Sarah Boyack.

A concordat set out agreed frameworks for co-operation between it and the United Kingdom government Department for Environment, Food and Rural Affairs

Many of the functions of SEERAD were subsumed into the Environment Directorate in 2007.

Structure
The department had three executive agencies:
 Scottish Agricultural Science Agency, which is responsible for scientific research into agriculture
 Fisheries Research Services, which carries out scientific research into the fisheries and aquaculture areas
 Scottish Fisheries Protection Agency, responsible for enforcing fisheries regulations in Scottish waters, and monitoring compliance

The department sponsored several non-departmental public bodies (NDPBs) including: 
 Crofters Commission
 Deer Commission for Scotland
 Royal Botanic Garden Edinburgh
 Scottish Environment Protection Agency
 Scottish Natural Heritage
 The Loch Lomond and the Trossachs National Park Authority
 The Macaulay Institute

The department also worked with Scottish Water.

References

External links
 Scottish Government website 

Defunct departments of the Scottish Government
1999 establishments in Scotland
1999 in British politics
2007 disestablishments in Scotland
Economy of Scotland
Climate change in Scotland
Scottish coast and countryside
Science and technology in Scotland
Environment of Scotland
Environmental organisations based in Scotland
Rural Scotland
Ministries established in 1999
Ministries disestablished in 2007